Worrawech Danuwong (born 16 May 1984), also known as Dan, is a Thai singer and actor, who was a member of Thai boy band, D2B. He graduated with a bachelor's degree in audio engineering from Rangsit University.

Biography
Worrawech Danuwong is a former member of the boy band D2B, which was very popular in Thailand. Dan entered a singing contest "Star Challenge 2000" applied by RS Promotion, and that was his first and important step of leading him to stardom, and become a member of D2B. He also uses WD as his stage name for his solo career as a singer.

 D2B is one of Thailand's most famous boy band groups. However, on July 22, 2003, a member of D2B, Big, got into a car accident and being in a coma state. During Big's years while being sick, Dan and Beam continued their music careers and released several duo albums together. The duo became known as Dan Beam. One of his most famous songs included "Wela Mai Keuy Por" (Not Enough Time, เวลาไม่เคยพอ).

After the contract with RS was ended in October 2008, Dan decided not to renew and left RS entertainment business. He decided to sign a contract with Sony Music (Thailand) for 5 years.

Music career
Dan continued his solo career under Sony Music after leaving RS company. On 17 October 2008, a press conference was held at Dhusit Thani Hotel for his comeback and upcoming new album, which was expected to be released in 2009. He stated that Sony Music is a company where he can work for and allow freedom to collaborate with other companies in music and in acting as he wanted a new experience to further his career especially in music composing. He also highlighted that he didn't have any problems with his former company and was ready to work again any time in the future. In his interview during the press conference, he admitted that he felt stressed in making his decision since he had been working at his old company for 6–7 years. Thinking that his decision would be a change for his life, he made the best decision possible and had discussed it with his family.

His first solo album named "Blue" was released on July 27, 2009, and the press conference was held on August 4, 2009. The second album "Solo Motion" was released in 2011.

Personal life 
He has a relationship with Ungsumalynn Sirapatsakmetha. He met her since 2009 in a drama filming. After that, they began to build relationship.

Discography

D2B
 2001 - D2B
 2002 - D2B Summer
 2003 - D2B Type II
 2004 - D2B The Neverending Album Tribute To Big D2B

Dan-Beam
 2005 - Dan-Beam The Album
 2006 - Dan-Beam The Album II Relax
 2007 - Dan-Beam The Album 3 Freedom
 2007 - DB2B (Dan Beam To Big)

Dan WD (Solo Album)
 2009 - Blue
 2011 - Solo Motion

Others
 2002 - TV Soundtrack : Wai-Rai-Freshy (วัยร้ายเฟรชชี่)
 2004 - Special Album : The Messages - Various Artists
 2006 - Movie Soundtrack : Noodles Boxer (แสบสนิท ศิษย์ส่ายหน้า)
 2009 - Movie Soundtrack : 32 December Love Error (32 ธันวา) - 2 Tracks
 2011 - Movie Soundtrack : Bangkok Sweety 
 2011 - Movie Soundtrack : The Melody

Filmography

Films
 2003 - Omen (Sung Horn : สังหรณ์)
 2006 - Noodles Boxer (แสบสนิท ศิษย์ส่ายหน้า)
 2009 - Phobia 2 (Ha Praeng : 5 แพร่ง)
 2009 - 32 December Love Error (32 ธันวา)
 2011 - Bangkok Sweety
 2011 - The Melody
 2012 - Valentine Sweety
 2012 - Sat2mon
 2014 - The One Ticket (ตัวพ่อเรียกพ่อ)

Television Series (Lakorn)
 2002 - Wai-Rai-Freshy (วัยร้ายเฟรชชี่)
 2004 - Koo-Kam 2 (คู่กรรม 2)
 2005 - Pee-Nong-Song-Luead (พี่น้อง 2 เลือด)
 2005 - Hoi-An-Chun-Ruk-Ther (ฮอยอัน ฉันรักเธอ)
 2005 - Nai-Kra-Jork (นายกระจอก)
 2006 - Mon-Ruk-Lottery (มนต์รักล็อตเตอรี่)
 2006 - Pee-Chai (พี่ชาย)
 2007 - Poot-Ruk-Na-Mo (ภูตรักนะโม)
 2007 - Pee-Kaew-Nang-Hong (ปี่แก้วนางหงส์)
 2009 - Spy The Series (สายลับเดอะซีรี่ส์ กับ 24 คดีสุดห้ามใจ)
 2010 - Ku-Larb-Sorn-Narm (กุหลาบซ่อนหนาม)
 2010 - Sueb-suan-puan-rak (สืบสวนป่วนรัก)
 2011 - Sud-Yod  (สุดยอด)
 2013 - ฟาร์มเอ๋ย ฟาร์มรัก

MC
 Television 
 2006 : รายการพิเศษ "ไดอารี่สเปเชี่ยล" On Air Channel 3
 2007 : "แดนบีม เดอะซีรีส์" On Air Channel 9
 2009 : รายการพิเศษ "เชอร์ล็อก โฮล์มส์ ดับแผนพิฆาตโลก ทีวี สเปเชียล" On Air Channel 7

 Online 
 2018 : แดนแพทตี้ Reality On Air YouTube:DanPattie TV

References

Living people
Worrawech Danuwong
Worrawech Danuwong
1984 births
Worrawech Danuwong
Worrawech Danuwong
Worrawech Danuwong
Worrawech Danuwong
Thai television personalities
Worrawech Danuwong
Worrawech Danuwong